Baltagiya or Baltageya is an Egyptian slang word that generally means "goons" or "thugs" or "gangs or criminals," who are often hired to attack regime targets, anti-regime protestors or any peaceful people even if they had nothing to do with politics, in the majority of times those gangs are paid thugs. Meanwhile  "Baltaga" , that etymologically comes from the Turkish word "baltacı" meaning axeman, means doing harm or participating in corruption against someone or some people. Nonpolitical baltagiya gangs appeared in Egypt in the 1980s; in the 1990s the Egyptian police decided to hire them, "outsourcing coercion to these baltagiya, paying them well and training them to use sexualized brutality (from groping to rape) in order to punish and deter female protesters and male detainees, alike". They gained international media attention when spotted in the fighting in Tahrir Square during the 2011 Egyptian Revolution. In the Port Said Stadium disaster on 1 February 2012, eyewitnesses accused the police of allowing baltagiya in plain clothes into the stadium with weapons and then not intervening to stop the violence.

See also
 Shabiha
 Titushky

References

Street gangs